This is a list of the heritage sites in Eastern Cape as recognized by the South African Heritage Resource Agency. For performance reasons some districts have been split off from this list:

 List of heritage sites in Albany
 List of heritage sites in Graaff-Reinet
 List of heritage sites in Port Elizabeth

|}

References 

Tourist attractions in the Eastern Cape
Eastern Cape
Heritage sites